The zebra loach (Botia striata) is a freshwater loach native to rivers and streams in the Western Ghats of India.

Zebra loaches are peaceful fish suitable to community aquarium tanks. However, being bottom feeders, they may show some aggression against other smaller bottom feeders. Therefore, small corydoras are not suitable tankmates. They should be kept in groups of at least five. Any fewer and they will become stressed. They require some caves in which to hide during most of daylight. B. striata will accept a wide variety of fish foods, including live food such as blackworms, snails and small shrimps, and most commercial brands of sinking fish foods.

This species is shy, and will spend much of its time hiding. Also rarely, during times of stress it has been seen to attack smaller fish such as tetras.

According to the IUCN, the zebra loach is currently endangered in the wild due to habitat alteration combined with a small native range. Aquarists interested in keeping zebra loach specimens are strongly advised to investigate the source of locally available fishes, and to only purchase those known to be captive-bred. Home aquarium breeding is unknown, but the species is bred on a commercial basis with the use of hormones.

References
 
 

Botiidae
Taxa named by C. R. Narayan Rao
Fish described in 1920